The 1913 Alma maroon and Cream football team represented the Alma College during the 1913 college football season.

Schedule

References

Alma
Alma Scots football seasons
Alma Maroon and Cream football